Salem Center is a multi-building, enclosed shopping center in downtown Salem, Oregon, United States. Located on both sides of Center Street between High and Liberty streets, the mall has 80 stores and a food court. The anchors are: Kohl's, Ross Dress for Less, and Macy's with two vacant anchors last occupied by JCPenney and Nordstrom. The mall also features five sky bridges, one of which connects Macy's to the mall, another connects the mall to an adjacent city-owned parking garage, with another connecting the former JCPenney to the mall, in addition to connecting the two mall buildings across Center Street. Salem Center is managed by Jones Lang Lasalle.

Early history
Salem Center's roots can be traced back to 1955, when Meier & Frank opened a two-level department store and parking garage, which was the first branch location in the chain. JCPenney also opened a two-level store nearby in 1965. While those two stores were originally designed as freestanding buildings, they eventually became integrated into the later mall development as anchor stores, and were connected to the mall via skybridges.

Mall development history
Construction began on the new shopping center in 1978. Salem Center then opened in 1979, and was remodeled in 1988 and again in 1995. Until approximately 2004 the mall was known as Salem Centre. The Kohl's location was previously a Mervyns store until 2007, while Macy's location is a converted Meier & Frank with the name change in 2006. The mall launched a service in January 2008 that allowed people to search all products offered by the mall's stores, claiming to be the first mall in Oregon to have such a service. In 2009, the center started an annual tradition of having a Lego menorah built and lighted to celebrate Hanukkah.

On January 31, 2018, it was announced that Nordstrom would be closing in April 2018.

On June 4, 2020, JCPenney announced that this location would also be closing on October 18, 2020 as part of a plan to close 154 stores nationwide which left Kohl's and Macy's as the only anchors left.

See also
List of shopping malls in Oregon
Lancaster Mall

References

External links

1987 picture of the mall

Shopping malls in Oregon
Buildings and structures in Salem, Oregon
Tourist attractions in Salem, Oregon
Shopping malls established in 1979
1979 establishments in Oregon